SCR Public School is a public school located in Sheetla Colony Phase 2, Gurgaon, Haryana, India. The school is affiliated with the Central Board of Secondary Education. It was founded in 1999 by Chandi Ram Kataria, and has around 1500 students and more than 100 teachers.

The school has a canteen and a library. It also has computer, physics, chemistry, and biology labs.

SCR Group of Schools 
SCR Public School - located at Street Number 3, Sheetla Colony Phase 2, Gurugram, Haryana 122017
 SCR Model School - located at Block J, Ashok Vihar Phase III, Gurugram, Haryana 122017
 SCR Global School - located at Block C 1, Palam Vihar, Gurugram, Haryana 122017

Private schools in Haryana
Schools in Gurgaon
Educational institutions established in 1999
1999 establishments in Haryana